The 1985 Fiji rugby union tour of British Isles was a series of matches played in October 1985 in Wales, Ireland, and England by the Fiji national rugby union team.

Results

References

Note

Fiji
tour
Fiji national rugby union team tours
tour
tour
tour
Rugby union tours of Ireland
Rugby union tours of Wales
Rugby union tours of England